Matteo Bianchi (born 21 October 2001) is an Italian cyclist who won a silver medal at the 2022 European Championships.

National records
 1 km time trial: 59.661 ( Munich, 15 August 2022) - current holder.

References

External links
 

2001 births
Living people
Italian male cyclists
Cyclists of Gruppo Sportivo Esercito
21st-century Italian people